Controlled Chaos is the debut studio EP by the American musician Morgan Rose, released on November 27, 2020, through Rise Records. The EP's first single, "The Answer" was released two weeks earlier.

Recording
Morgan Rose entered The Lair studio in Culver City, California, and tracked six songs within ten days in mid-2020 and has co-written the EP with Clint Lowery. Rose recorded all the vocals, piano and drums while Lowery performed all the guitars and Jason Christopher played the bass. Regarding the recording of the EP he stated:

Promotion
On November 30, 2020, Rose released a music video for "Exhale". The video, directed by Chuck Brueckmann, follows Rose as he prepares to head out and face all the challenges the world presents him while inspiring others to follow his path.

Track listing

Personnel
Adapted from AllMusic.

 Morgan Rose – vocals, piano, drums, production
 Clint Lowery – guitar
 Jason Christopher – bass

Andrew Groves – production, programming, composition
Chris Coulter – engineering, programming
Lizzy Ostro – engineering

References

External links
Official Morgan Rose Website

2020 debut EPs
Hard rock EPs
Sevendust